Kyle Luke Zunic (born 4 March 1999) is an Australian professional basketball player for the Northside Wizards of the NBL1 North. He is also contracted with the Perth Wildcats of the National Basketball League (NBL). He played four seasons of college basketball in the United States for the Winthrop Eagles before joining the Wildcats in 2021.

Early life and career
Zunic was born in Sydney, New South Wales, in the southern suburb of Kogarah. His family later moved to Sanctuary Point, where he attended Sanctuary Point Public School. Around 10 and 11 years old, he played rugby league. He started playing basketball in Shellharbour before moving to Wollongong to play representative basketball for the Illawarra Hawks. He played for NSW Country at national tournaments.

Zunic moved to Canberra to attend the Basketball Australia Centre of Excellence and Lake Ginninderra College. He played for the Centre of Excellence in the South East Australian Basketball League (SEABL) in 2016 and 2017. He averaged 8.0 points in his first season and 16.3 points in the second season.

College career
In April 2017, Zunic signed a National Letter of Intent to play college basketball for Winthrop University in the United States.

As a freshman for the Winthrop Eagles in 2017–18, Zunic played 26 games with nine starts and averaged 6.8 points, 1.3 rebounds and 1.3 assists in 18.8 minutes per game. He missed games with injuries to his ankles and appendix issues.

As a sophomore in 2018–19, Zunic averaged career highs in points (8.6), rebounds (4.3), assists (1.9) and minutes (21.8). He played 30 games and made 18 starts. On 20 December 2018, he had a career-high 21 points and 10 rebounds against UMES.

As a junior in 2019–20, Zunic was named to the Big South Conference All-Academic Team and helped the Eagles win the Big South Conference tournament. He played 32 games with seven starts and averaged 5.5 points, 3.0 rebounds and 1.9 assists in 18.7 minutes per game. He became the 24th player in program history to hit 100 career 3-pointers.

As a senior in 2020–21, Zunic was again named to the Big South Conference All-Academic Team and helped the Eagles win the Big South Conference tournament for the second year in a row. He played 25 games with a career-high 24 starts and averaged 5.0 points, 2.6 rebounds and 1.4 assists in 19.6 minutes per game.

College statistics

|-
| style="text-align:left;"| 2017–18
| style="text-align:left;"| Winthrop
| 26 || 9 || 18.8 || .428 || .372 || .759 || 1.3 || 1.3 || .6 || .1 || 6.8
|-
| style="text-align:left;"| 2018–19
| style="text-align:left;"| Winthrop
| 30 || 18 || 21.8 || .405 || .324 || .667 || 4.3 || 1.9 || .7 || .2 || 8.6
|-
| style="text-align:left;"| 2019–20
| style="text-align:left;"| Winthrop
| 32 || 7 || 18.7 || .393 || .309 || .759 || 3.0 || 1.9 || .5 || .1 || 5.5
|-
| style="text-align:left;"| 2020–21
| style="text-align:left;"| Winthrop
| 25 || 24 || 19.6 || .359 || .341 || .609 || 2.6 || 1.4 || .8 || .1 || 5.0
|-
| style="text-align:center;" colspan="2"|Career
| 113 || 58 || 19.7 || .399 || .335 || .705 || 2.9 || 1.6 || .6 || .1 || 6.5
|-

Professional career
In June 2021, Zunic joined the USC Rip City of the NBL1 North. In 12 games, he averaged 12.91 points, 6.33 rebounds, 5.08 assists and 1.16 steals per game.

On 6 September 2021, Zunic signed with the Perth Wildcats of the National Basketball League (NBL) as a development player for the 2021–22 season. He made his NBL debut on 3 December 2021, scoring two points in 17½ minutes as a starter in the Wildcats' 85–73 season-opening win over the Adelaide 36ers. He became the first development player in NBL history to earn a start in his debut. In 16 games, he averaged 1.7 points and 1.3 rebounds per game.

Zunic joined the Warwick Senators for the 2022 NBL1 West season. In 18 games, he averaged 17.78 points, 4.78 rebounds, 4.28 assists and 1.56 steals per game.

On 24 May 2022, Zunic was elevated to the Wildcats' main roster on a two-year deal. He appeared in 14 games during the 2022–23 NBL season, averaging 1.6 points per game.

Zunic joined the Northside Wizards for the 2023 NBL1 North season.

National team career
In 2015, Zunic helped the Australian under-16 team win gold at the FIBA Oceania Under-16 Championship in New Zealand.

In 2016, Zunic represented Australia at the FIBA Under-17 World Championship in Spain. That same year, he won silver with the Australian under-19 team at the FIBA Oceania Under-18 Championship in Fiji. He also competed at the Albert Schweitzer Tournament in Germany.

In 2019, Zunic helped the Australian University National Team win bronze at the World University Games in Italy. He recorded a team-high four assists in the bronze medal game against Israel.

In February 2022, Zunic was named in the Australian Boomers squad for the FIBA World Cup Qualifiers in Japan.

Personal life
Zunic is the son of Zoran and Tania Zunic. His father played in the NBL for the Sydney Supersonics (1983) and Sydney Kings (1988). His brother, Jordan, is a professional golfer.

References

External links

NBL profile
NBL1 profile
FIBA profile
Winthrop Eagles bio

1999 births
Living people
Australian men's basketball players
Australian expatriate basketball people in the United States
Medalists at the 2019 Summer Universiade
Perth Wildcats players
Point guards
Shooting guards
Sportsmen from New South Wales
Winthrop Eagles men's basketball players
Universiade bronze medalists for Australia
Universiade medalists in basketball